Andrew Scott Heiberger (born January 18, 1968) is a successful entrepreneur and New York real estate industry veteran. He is the founder, owner and CEO of Buttonwood Development, a Manhattan-based real estate development firm. He is also the founder and owner of Town Residential, a residential real estate brokerage in Manhattan. He previously served as CEO of Citi Habitats, a residential brokerage in Manhattan that he founded in 1994 and sold in 2004.

Heiberger is a licensed real estate broker in New York and a member of the Real Estate Board of New York, having served on its board of governors.  Heiberger is also a member of the World Presidents' Organization and the New York State Bar Association. He was listed in Crain's New York Business 40 under 40 in 1998 and was named Entrepreneur of the Year by Ernst & Young in 2001 and finalist for the Ernst & Young National Entrepreneur of the Year that year.

Throughout his career, Andrew has been dedicated to giving back to the community and supported a multitude of charities including the Friends of the IDF, The Princess Margaret Hospital, The Fresh Air Fund, A Little Hope Foundation, The Max Cure Foundation, The Mann Foundation, The NephCure Foundation, Charna Radbell Foundation, Jewish National Fund, Friars Foundation, 100 Mile Man Foundation, CCFA (Crohn’s & Colitis Foundation of America), American Heart Association, the University of Michigan Scholarship Fund, The Wildlife Rescue Center of the Hamptons and the Make-A-Wish Foundation. Additionally, Andrew has been involved with industry groups including the Young Presidents’ Organization, the University of Michigan TriState Leadership Committee, and the REBNY Board of Governors.

Early life
A passion for real estate began at a young age for Andrew, working with his family to trade land and sell property on Long Island  at the age of 16. Heiberger graduated from the University of Michigan with a bachelor's degree and a law degree from the University of Miami School of Law. He is both a licensed attorney and a licensed Real Estate Broker in the State of New York.

Career
In 1994, at the age of 26, Heiberger founded Citi Habitats, a Manhattan-based residential brokerage. Approximately ten years later, Heiberger sold Citi Habitats to NRT LLC.

In 2005, Heiberger founded Buttonwood Development, a real estate development, investment and advisory firm in New York City. The development firm was named after the street in Dix Hills, New York that he grew up on as a child.

Heiberger returned to the brokerage business with the founding of Town Residential, a luxury residential real estate firm, in December 2010. Within one year, the firm was ranked in The Real Deal's list of top 10 largest residential brokerages in Manhattan. As of September 2016, Town Residential had over 7 locations in Manhattan and was also listed in Crain's "Best Places To Work" list. Under his leadership the firm grew to over 500 Representatives and professionals and transacted over $14 billion.

Personal life
Heiberger's mother was a real estate broker and his father was a homebuilder. He lives in New York City with his wife and three children.

References

1968 births
Living people
American real estate brokers
University of Michigan alumni
University of Miami School of Law alumni
American chief executives
American company founders